Andrea Badami (1913–2002) was an American painter who became "an internationally known folk artist." His work can be seen at the Museum of Nebraska Art. He received no formal art education, since his parents considered it a waste of time.

References

1913 births
2002 deaths
People from Omaha, Nebraska
Painters from Nebraska
Painters from Arizona
20th-century American painters
American male painters
20th-century American male artists